Melanie Benjamin may refer to:

Melanie Benjamin (Ojibwe leader) (born 1945), Native American leader
Melanie Benjamin (author) (born 1962), American historical novelist

See also
Benjamin (surname)
Melanie